Huernia thuretii is a species of flowering plant in the family Apocynaceae, native to Namibia, and the Cape Provinces of South Africa. A succulent, as Huernia thurettii it has gained the Royal Horticultural Society's Award of Garden Merit.

References

thuretii
Flora of Namibia
Flora of the Cape Provinces
Plants described in 1866